David Beland (October 23, 1886 – February 21, 1924) was a Canadian athlete.  He competed at the 1908 Summer Olympics in London. In the 100 metres, Beland placed third of four in his first round heat to be eliminated from competition. Beland was born in Quebec City, and not Louiseville.

References

 
 
 

1886 births
1924 deaths
Sportspeople from Quebec
Olympic track and field athletes of Canada
Athletes (track and field) at the 1908 Summer Olympics
Canadian male sprinters